Penpillick is a hamlet in Cornwall, England, UK. It is about two miles north of St Blazey on the A390 road.

References

Hamlets in Cornwall